Siagonium punctatum is a species of flat rove beetle in the family Staphylinidae.

References

Further reading

External links

 
 

Piestinae
Beetles described in 1866